Ludwig van Beethoven's Piano Sonata No. 29 in B major, Op. 106 (known as the Große Sonate für das Hammerklavier, or more simply as the Hammerklavier) is a piano sonata that is widely viewed as one of the most important works of the composer's third period and among the greatest piano sonatas of all time. Completed in 1818, it is often considered to be Beethoven's most technically challenging piano composition and one of the most demanding solo works in the classical piano repertoire.
The first documented public performance was in 1836 by Franz Liszt in the Salle Erard in Paris.

Composition 

Dedicated to his patron, the Archduke Rudolf, the sonata was written primarily from the summer of 1817 to the late autumn of 1818, towards the end of a fallow period in Beethoven's compositional career. It represents the spectacular emergence of many of the themes that were to recur in Beethoven's late period: the reinvention of traditional forms, such as sonata form; a brusque humour; and a return to pre-classical compositional traditions, including an exploration of modal harmony and reinventions of the fugue within classical forms.

The Hammerklavier also set a precedent for the length of solo compositions (performances typically take about 40 to 45 minutes, depending on interpretative choices). While orchestral works such as symphonies and concerti had often contained movements of 15 or even 20 minutes for many years, few single movements in solo literature had a span such as the Hammerklavier'''s third movement.

The sonata's name comes from Beethoven's later practice of using German rather than Italian words for musical terminology. (Hammerklavier literally means "hammer-keyboard", and is still today the German name for the fortepiano, the predecessor of the modern piano.) It comes from the title page of the work, "Große Sonate für das Hammerklavier", which means "Grand sonata for the fortepiano". The more sedate Sonata No. 28 in A major, Op. 101 has the same description, but the epithet has come to apply to the Sonata No. 29 only. "Hammerklavier" was part of the title to specify that the work was not to be played on the harpsichord, an instrument that was still very much in evidence in the early 1800s. The work also makes extensive use of the una corda pedal, with Beethoven giving for his time unusually detailed instructions when to use it.

 Structure 

The piece contains four movements, a structure often used by Beethoven, and imitated by contemporaries such as Schubert, Schumann, and Chopin, in contrast to the more usual three or two movements of Mozart's and Haydn's sonatas. The four movements are:

In addition to the thematic connections within the movements and the use of traditional Classical formal structures, Charles Rosen has described how much of the piece is organised around the motif of a descending third (major or minor). This descending third is quite ubiquitous throughout the work but most clearly recognizable in the following sections: the opening fanfare of the Allegro; in the scherzo's imitation of the aforementioned fanfare, as well as in its trio theme; in bar two of the adagio; and in the fugue in both its introductory bass octave-patterns and in the main subject, as the seven-note runs which end up on notes descended by thirds.

 I. Allegro 

The first movement opens with a series of fortissimo B-major chords, which form much of the basis of the first subject. After the first subject is spun out for a while, the opening set of fortissimo chords are stated again, this time followed by a similar rhythm on the unexpected chord of D major. This ushers in the more lyrical second subject in the submediant (that is, a minor third below the tonic), G major. A third and final musical subject appears after this, which exemplifies the fundamental opposition of B and B in this movement through its chromatic alterations of the third scale degree. The exposition ends with a largely stepwise figure in the treble clef in a high register, while the left hand moves in an octave-outlining accompaniment in eighth notes.

The development section opens with a statement of this final figure, except with alterations from the major subdominant to the minor, which fluidly modulates to E major. Directly after, the exposition's first subject is composed in fugato and features an incredible display of musical development. The fugato ends with a section featuring non-fugal imitation between registers, eventually resounding in repeated D-major chords. The final section of the development begins with a chromatic alteration of D to D. The music progresses to the alien key of B major, in which the third and first subjects of the exposition are played. The retransition is brought about by a sequence of rising intervals that get progressively higher, until the first theme is stated again in the home key of B, signalling the beginning of the recapitulation.

In keeping with Beethoven's exploration of the potentials of sonata form, the recapitulation avoids a full harmonic return to B major until long after the return to the first theme. The coda repetitively cites motives from the opening statement over a shimmering pedal point and disappears into pianississimo until two fortissimo B major chords conclude the movement.

 II. Scherzo: Assai vivace 

The brief second movement includes a great variety of harmonic and thematic material. The scherzo's theme – which Rosen calls a humorous form of the first movement's first subject – is at once playful, lively, and pleasant. The scherzo, in B major, maintains the standard ternary form by repeating the sections an octave higher in the treble clef. 

The trio, marked "semplice", is in the parallel minor, B minor, but the effect is more shadowy than dramatic. It borrows the opening theme from the composer's Eroica symphony and places it in a minor key. Following this dark interlude, Beethoven inserts a more intense presto section in  meter, still in the minor, which eventually segues back to the scherzo. After a varied reprise of the scherzo's first section, a coda with a meter change to cut time follows. This coda plays with the semitonal relationship between B and B, and briefly returns to the first theme before dying away.

 III. Adagio sostenuto 

The ternary-form slow movement, centred on F minor, has been called, among other things, a "mausoleum of collective sorrow", and is notable for its ethereality and great length as a slow movement (e.g. Wilhelm Kempff played for approximately 16 minutes and Christoph Eschenbach 25 minutes) that finally ends with a Picardy third. Paul Bekker called the movement "the apotheosis of pain, of that deep sorrow for which there is no remedy, and which finds expression not in passionate outpourings, but in the immeasurable stillness of utter woe". Wilhelm Kempff described it as "the most magnificent monologue Beethoven ever wrote".

Structurally, it follows traditional Classical-era sonata form, but the recapitulation of the main theme is varied to include extensive figurations in the right hand that anticipate some of the techniques of Romantic piano music. NPR's Ted Libbey writes, "An entire line of development in Romantic music—passing through Schubert, Chopin, Schumann, Brahms, and even Liszt—springs from this music."

 IV. Introduzione: Largo... Allegro – Fuga: Allegro risoluto 

The movement begins with a slow introduction that serves to transition from the third movement. To do so, it modulates from D major/B minor to G major/E minor to B major/G minor to A major, which modulates to B major for the fugue. Dominated by falling thirds in the bass line, the music three times pauses on a pedal and engages in speculative contrapuntal experimentation, in a manner foreshadowing the quotations from the first three movements of the Ninth Symphony in the opening of the fourth movement of that work.

After a final modulation to B major, the main substance of the movement appears: a titanic three-voice fugue in  meter. The subject of the fugue can be divided itself into three parts: a tenth leap followed by a trill to the tonic; a 7-note scale figure repeated descending by a third; and a tail semiquaver passage marked by many chromatic passing tones, whose development becomes the main source for the movement's unique dissonance. Marked con alcune licenze ("with some licenses"), the fugue, one of Beethoven's greatest contrapuntal achievements, as well as making tremendous demands on the performer, moves through a number of contrasting sections and includes a number of "learned" contrapuntal devices, often, and significantly, wielded with a dramatic fury and dissonance inimical to their conservative and academic associations. Some examples: augmentation of the fugue theme and countersubject in a sforzando marcato at bars 96–117, the massive stretto of the tenth leap and trill which follows, a contemplative episode beginning at bar 152 featuring the subject in retrograde, leading to an exploration of the theme in inversion at bar 209.

 Influence 

The work was perceived as almost unplayable but was nevertheless seen as the summit of piano literature since its very first publication. Completed in 1818, it is often considered to be Beethoven's most technically challenging piano composition and one of the most demanding solo works in the classical piano repertoire.

The Piano Sonata No. 1 in C, Op. 1 by Johannes Brahms opens with a fanfare similar to the fanfare heard at the start of the Hammerklavier sonata.

 Orchestration 
The composer Felix Weingartner produced an orchestration of the sonata. In 1878, Friedrich Nietzsche had suggested such an orchestration:
In the lives of great artists, there are unfortunate contingencies which, for example, force the painter to sketch his most significant picture as only a fleeting thought, or which forced Beethoven to leave us only the unsatisfying piano reduction of a symphony in certain great piano sonatas (the great B flat major). In such cases, the artist coming after should try to correct the great men's lives after the fact; for example, a master of all orchestral effects would do so by restoring to life the symphony that had suffered an apparent pianistic death.

However, Charles Rosen considered attempts to orchestrate the work "nonsensical".

 References 

 Further reading 
 
Extensive discussion and analysis is given in Charles Rosen's book The Classical Style'' (2nd ed., 1997, New York:  Norton):  .

External links 

Piano Sonata 29
1818 compositions
Compositions in B-flat major
Music with dedications